"That's For Me" is a popular song, written by Richard Rodgers, with the lyrics by Oscar Hammerstein II. The song was published in 1945 and included in the 1945 version of the musical film State Fair.
 
Popular recordings in 1945 were made by Jo Stafford and Dick Haymes.

The recording by Dick Haymes was released by Decca Records as catalog number 18706. It first reached the Billboard Best Seller chart on October 25, 1945, and lasted 4 weeks on the chart, peaking at #6. 
The recording by Jo Stafford was released by Capitol Records as catalog number 213. It reached the Billboard Best Seller chart at #9 on November 8, 1945, its only week on the chart.

Other versions
The song was also sung by Dinah Shore on the radio programme Birds Eye Open House, dated 18 October 1945.
Louis Armstrong - for the 45rpm box-set Jazz Concert (1950).
Julie London - for her album London by Night (1958).
Gordon MacRae - for his album Our Love Story (1960).
Pat Boone - included in the album Rodgers And Hammerstein's State Fair (1962).
Sammy Davis Jr. - for his album The Shelter of Your Arms (1964).

References

1945 songs
Jo Stafford songs
Carmen McRae songs
Songs written for films
Songs with music by Richard Rodgers
Songs with lyrics by Oscar Hammerstein II
Songs from Rodgers and Hammerstein musicals
State Fair (franchise)